Global Gladiators is a 1992 platform game published and developed by Virgin Games, originally programmed by David Perry for the Sega Genesis and eventually ported by other Virgin Games teams in Europe to the Master System, Game Gear, and Amiga. The game is based on the McDonald's fast food chain and has a strong environmentalist message.

The game is a spiritual successor to the NES game M.C. Kids, another McDonald's-themed game that also featured Mick and Mack as its playable characters.

Gameplay
In the single-player game, the player controls Mick or Mack through four worlds; Slime World, Mystical Forest, Toxi-town and Arctic World. Each world has several sub-stages where the character must collect a certain number of Golden Arches to advance. They are guided in their quest by Ronald McDonald, who appears at the beginning and the end of the game. The characters are armed with a Super Soaker-type gun that shoots gooey projectiles.

Development and release
During Virgin Mastertronic's expansion into the United States, it entered a deal with McDonald's to publish a video game themed around its restaurants within six months. Programmer David Perry, then an employee of Probe Software, convinced Virgin with his work on The Terminator that he could quickly make a satisfactory game for the Sega Genesis. Virgin contacted Perry with a generous offer to hire him into their American development branch in Irvine, California, and granted him an apartment overlooking Laguna Beach.

For Global Gladiators, the development team combined tools that they had developed for previous titles. The animation, background art, and music were respectively created by Mike Dietz, Christian Laursen, and Tommy Tallarico. David Bishop served as the game's designer, while the levels were designed by Bill Anderson. Aside from some branding, the game had little to do with the McDonald's franchise. This displeased visiting McDonald's executives, who questioned the lack of restaurants and Ronald McDonald. To this, Perry bluntly replied that no one liked Ronald McDonald and no one wanted restaurants in the game. Perry had planned to return to the United Kingdom upon the game's completion, but its unexpected critical success convinced him to stay in California; as he recalled, "it suddenly made people appreciate me". Global Gladiators impressed Walt Disney Computer Software producer Patrick Gilmore, which led to a relationship between Virgin and Disney that would produce such titles as Disney's Aladdin and The Jungle Book.

Reception

Sega Pro magazine gave an overall score of 93/100 noting the game’s challenging difficulty,  praising the games graphics stating “brilliantly animated sprites and characters give this game a very polished feel” and the game’s sound as “very much geared to the rave style with a few rocky tunes for good measure” and concluding “A great game that will keep up till the wee hours, a definite purchase for all of you seeking a big challenge.” Mega Action gave an overall score of 93% and describing the game as "A brilliant game with some really nice sprites."

See also
 M.C. Kids
 McDonald's Treasure Land Adventure

References

External links
 
 Mick & Mack as the Global Gladiators at Sega-16

1992 video games
Advergames
Amiga games
Game Gear games
Master System games
McDonald's video games
Sega Genesis games
Single-player video games
Video games developed in the United States
Video games scored by Tommy Tallarico
Virgin Interactive games